Hyaenodonta ("hyena teeth") is an extinct order of hypercarnivorous placental pan-carnivoran mammals from mirorder Ferae. Hyaenodonts were important mammalian predators that arose during the early Paleocene in Europe and persisted well into the late Miocene.

Characteristics 

Hyaenodonts are characterized by long skulls, slender jaws, slim bodies and a plantigrade stance. They generally ranged in size from 30 to 140 cm at the shoulder. The anatomy of their skulls show that they had a particularly acute sense of smell, while their teeth were adapted for shearing, rather than crushing.

Because of their size range, it is probable that different species hunted in different ways, which allowed them to fill many different predatory niches. Smaller ones would hunt in packs during the night like wolves, and bigger, fiercer ones would hunt alone during the daylight, using their sheer size and their mighty jaws as their principal weapon. The carnassials in a hyaenodonts are generally the second upper and third lower molars. However, some hyaenodonts possessed as many as three sequential pairs of carnassials or carnassial-like molar teeth in their jaws. Hyaenodonts, like all creodonts, lacked post-carnassial crushing molar teeth, such as those found in many carnivoran families, especially the Canidae and Ursidae, and thus lacked dental versatility for processing any foods other than meat.

Hyaenodonts differed from Carnivora in that they replaced their deciduous dentition slower in development than carnivorans. Studies on Hyaenodon show that juveniles took 3–4 years in the last stage of tooth eruption, implying a very long adolescent phase. In North American forms, the first upper premolar erupts before the first upper molar, while European forms show an earlier eruption of the first upper molar.

At least one hyaenodont lineage, subfamily Apterodontinae, was specialised for aquatic, otter-like habits.

Range
Having evolved in Europe during the Paleocene, hyaenodonts soon after spread into Africa and India, implying close biogeographical connections between these areas. Afterwards they dispersed into Asia from either Europe or India, and finally North America from either Europe or Asia.

They were important hypercarnivores in Eurasia, Africa and North America during the Oligocene, but declined towards the end of the epoch, with almost the entire order becoming extinct by the close of the Oligocene. Several representatives of this order, including hyainailourids Megistotherium, Simbakubwa, Hyainailouros, Sectisodon, Exiguodon, Sivapterodon, Metapterodon, and Isohyaenodon, the prionogalid Prionogale, the teratodontid Dissopsalis and the youngest species of genus Hyaenodon, H. weilini, survived into or evolved during the Miocene, of which, only Dissopsalis survived long enough to go extinct at the close of the Miocene. Traditionally this has been attributed to competition with carnivorans, but no formal examination of the correlation between the decline of hyaenodonts and the expansion of carnivorans has been recorded, and the latter may simply have moved into vacant niches after the extinction of hyaenodont species.

Classification and phylogeny

Relations 
Hyaenodonts were considerably more widespread and successful than the oxyaenids, the other clade of mammals originally classified along with the hyaenodonts as part of Creodonta. In 2015 phylogenetic analysis of Paleogene mammals, by Halliday et al., monophyly of Creodonta is confirmed and it is placed in the clade Ferae, closer to Pholidota than to Carnivora. However, order Creodonta is now considered to be a polyphyletic wastebasket taxon containing two unrelated clades assumed to be closely related (or ancestral) to Carnivora.

Taxonomy 

 ichnotaxa of Hyaenodonta:
 Ichnogenus: †Creodontipus (Santamaria, 1989)
 Ichnogenus: †Dischidodacylus (Sarjeant & Wilson, 1988)
 Ichnogenus: †Sarcotherichnus (Demathieu, 1984)
 Ichnogenus: †Zanclonychopus (Sarjeant & Langston, 1994)
 Ichnofamily: †Sarjeantipodidae (McCrea, Pemberton & Currie, 2004)
 Ichnogenus: †Hyaenodontipus (Ellenberger, 1980)
 Ichnogenus: †Quiritipes (Sarjeant, 2002)
 Ichnogenus: †Sarjeantipes (McCrea, Pemberton & Currie, 2004)
|}

Phylogeny 
The phylogenetic relationships of order Hyaenodonta are shown in the following cladograms:

{{clade |style=font-size:85%;line-height:100%;
|grouplabel1=

See also 
 Mammal classification
 Ferae
 Creodonta

References